Oshawa Metal or Oshawa Metal Centre is a General Motors of Canada facility in Oshawa, Ontario.

Built in 1986 to supply metal for Chevrolet Lumina and Buick Regal made in Oshawa, the plant now makes steel used at the Oshawa Car Assembly plant and other GM customers. It is GM's only metal facility in Canada located close to an assembly plant.

The  facilities makes over 80,000 parts a day using 337 tons of steel a day to make 22 million parts a year.

References

General Motors factories
1986 establishments in Ontario
Motor vehicle assembly plants in Canada
Buildings and structures in Oshawa